Nicole Seekamp (born 26 April 1992) is an Australian professional basketball player.

College
Seekamp played college basketball at the University of South Dakota in Vermillion, South Dakota for the Coyotes. After sitting out the 2011–12 season as a redshirt, Seekamp made her debut in 2012. Seekamp was the 2015–16 Summit League Player of the Year and led the Coyotes to a championship in the Women's National Invitation Tournament. She was named the Most Valuable Player of the 2016 WNIT. Seekamp was a three-time all-Summit League performer (2014–16) and two-time Summit League Tournament MVP (2013, 2015). She graduated from South Dakota as the program's second-leading scorer (2,056 points), second in assists (628) and second in steals (265).

Statistics 

|-
|2012–13
|South Dakota
|35
|35
|29.5
|.413
|.324
|.836
|4.0
|3.3
|1.6
|0.2
|2.6
|14.9
|-
|2013–14
|South Dakota
|28
|25
|31.2
|.380
|.319
|.885
|4.0
|3.8
|1.8
|0.5
|2.3
|15.5
|-
|2014–15
|South Dakota
|34
|34
|28.8
|.464
|.304
|.842
|3.6
|5.1
|1.9
|0.1
|2.5
|15.6
|-
|2015–16
|South Dakota
|36
|36
|30.0
|.450
|.370
|.864
|3.9
|6.4
|2.4
|0.1
|2.6
|15.9
|-
|Career
|
|133
|130
|29.8
|.429
|.333
|.858
|3.9
|4.7
|1.9
|0.2
|2.5
|15.5

Career

WNBL
Seekamp began her career, playing for the Australian Institute of Sport. After a brief stint, she then signed in her home state, with the Adelaide Lightning beginning with the 2017–18 WNBL season, after signing with the Adelaide Lightning. There, she joins a roster alongside the likes of Abby Bishop and Natalie Novosel. Seekamp garnered WNBL second-team honors in her first season back in Australia with a stat-line of 13.2 points, 5.1 assists, 4.2 rebounds and 2.4 steals per game. After the 2019–20 WNBL season Seekamp announced quit basketball and she has returned to her rural roots, started farmering in New South Wales.

Europe
Seekamp was signed by AZS PWSZ Gorzów Wielkopolski to play in the Polska Liga Koszykówki Kobiet for 2016–17. She averaged 11 points, five assists and 1.5 steals in her first professional season before deciding to return home to Australia to continue her playing career with the Adelaide Lightning in 2017.

National Team

Youth level
Seekamp made her international debut for the Gems at the 2010 FIBA Oceania Under-18 Championship in Palmerston, New Zealand. Seekamp was not selected for the Gems side for the Under-19 World Championship in Chile the following year.

Senior level
In March 2018, Seekamp was named to the Opals final roster for the 2018 Commonwealth Games. This would be Seekamp's debut for the Opals and at the senior international level. In 2019, Seekamp would go on to make her Opals debut at an official FIBA event after being named to the Opals roster for the 2019 FIBA Asia Cup.

References

1992 births
Living people
Australian expatriate basketball people in the United States
Australian Institute of Sport basketball (WNBL) players
Australian women's basketball players
Guards (basketball)
Sportswomen from South Australia
South Dakota Coyotes women's basketball players
Basketball players at the 2018 Commonwealth Games
Commonwealth Games medallists in basketball
Commonwealth Games gold medallists for Australia
Medallists at the 2018 Commonwealth Games